Violin Sonata No. 20 in C Major (K. 303/293c) was composed by Wolfgang Amadeus Mozart in March 1778 in Mannheim, Germany and was first published in the same year as part of Mozart's Opus 1 collection, which was dedicated to Maria Elisabeth, Electress of the Palatinate and are consequently known as the Palatine Sonatas.

The work consists of two movements:

References

External links 
 Violin Sonata No. 20 in C, K. 303 Free Scores from the International Music Score Library Project

303
1778 compositions
Compositions in C major
Music dedicated to nobility or royalty